Psychoda acutipennis is a species of insect of the order Diptera belonging to the family Psychodidae found in the Antipodes Islands of New Zealand.

References

 
 

Psychodidae
Diptera of New Zealand